The ÎleSoniq electronic music festival is a 3-day major electronic music and urban contemporary music music festival in Montreal, Quebec, that is held every summer at Parc Jean-Drapeau on Île Sainte-Hélène. The festival takes place on multiple stages with various audience capacities. The 2022's edition is scheduled from August 5–7, 2022, featuring headliners Swedish House Mafia, Illenium and Eric Prydz.
 
Growing from 25,000 attendees in its first year in 2014, ÎleSoniq's sixth edition (2019) marked a record 78,000 attendance, a jump from 2018's 65,000.

History

Created in 2014, ÎleSoniq is located into the heart of Montreal, at Espace 67 of Parc Jean-Drapeau. For three days, the festival has welcomed some of the world's most successful EDM and urban music artists, including Skrillex, The Chainsmokers, Adventure Club, Deadmau5, Die Antwoord, Above & Beyond, and MIGOS.

See also
 Osheaga Festival, music festival at Parc Jean-Drapeau
 Heavy Montreal, music festival at Parc Jean-Drapeau
 Piknic Électronik, weekly electronic music festival at Parc Jean-Drapeau during summer

References

External links
 Festival's homepage

Music festivals in Montreal
Electronic music festivals in Canada
2014 establishments in Quebec
Music festivals established in 2014